Ștefania Botcariu (born 11 January 1936) is a Romanian cross-country skier. She competed in the women's 10 kilometres and the women's 3 × 5 kilometre relay events at the 1956 Winter Olympics.

References

External links
 

1936 births
Living people
Romanian female cross-country skiers
Olympic cross-country skiers of Romania
Cross-country skiers at the 1956 Winter Olympics
Sportspeople from Bistrița
20th-century Romanian women